The 2018 Fordham Rams football team represented Fordham University in the 2018 NCAA Division I FCS football season. They were led by first-year head coach Joe Conlin and played their home games at Coffey Field as a member of the Patriot League. They finished the season 2–9, 2–4 in Patriot League play to finish in a three-way tie for fourth place.

Previous season
The Rams finished the 2017 season 4–7, 3–3 in Patriot League play to finish in a three-way tie for third place.

On December 5, head coach Andrew Breiner resigned to become the quarterbacks coach at Mississippi State. He finished at Fordham with a two-year record of 12–10.

Preseason

Preseason coaches poll
The Patriot League released their preseason coaches poll on July 26, 2018, with the Rams predicted to finish in third place.

Preseason All-Patriot League team
The Rams placed five players on the preseason all-Patriot League team.

Offense

Austin Longi – WR

Isaiah Searight – TE

Dominic Lombard – OL

Defense

Glenn Cunningham – LB

Dylan Mabin – DB

Schedule

Game summaries

at Charlotte

at Richmond

Stony Brook

Central Connecticut

Georgetown

at Lehigh

Bryant

Lafayette

Colgate

at Holy Cross

at Bucknell

References

Fordham
Fordham Rams football seasons
Fordham Rams football